Shan'ge is a genre of Chinese folk song. They are commonly sung in rural provinces; the word "Shan'ge" means "mountain song".

A number of different subtypes are:
Hua'er, a form popular in the Northwestern Chinese provinces such as Gansu, Ningxia and Qinghai, named to the Representative List of the Intangible Cultural Heritage of Humanity in 2009
Xintianyou and Shanqu are popular in Shaanxi and Shanxi
Zhengjinghong, from the Anhui province
Xingguo, from the Jiangxi province
Hengyang from the Hunan Province
Hakka hill song (Kejia shan'ge) from the Guangdong Province
Lalu, a Tibetan shan'ge
Changdiao (aradun-urtu-yin-daguu), a Mongolian shan'ge
Feige, a Miao shan'ge

Further reading
  - Volume 2 of the series "Emotions and States of Mind in China and East Asia".

External links
Shan'ge: Mountain Song

Chinese music
Chinese folk songs
Intangible Cultural Heritage of Humanity